Two referendums were held in Liechtenstein during 1947. The first was held on 10 January, on an initiative to reduce the rate of taxation, backdated to 1946, and was approved by 58.7% of voters. The second was held on 15 June concerning the law on power plants, and was approved by 91% of voters.

Results

Reduced tax rate

Power plant law

References

1947 referendums
1947 in Liechtenstein
1947
January 1947 events in Europe